Platycheirus coerulescens is a species of syrphid fly in the family Syrphidae.

References

Syrphinae
Articles created by Qbugbot
Insects described in 1887
Taxa named by Samuel Wendell Williston